Herb Alpert Presents Sergio Mendes & Brasil '66 is the first album by Sérgio Mendes and Brasil '66. It was inducted into the Grammy Hall of Fame in 2011. Referring to the song "Mas que Nada" Mendes said in 2014: "It was the first time that a song in Portuguese was a hit in America and all over the world".

Track listing

 "Mas que Nada" (Jorge Ben) 	
 "One Note Samba / Spanish Flea" (Antônio Carlos Jobim, Newton Mendonça / Julius Wechter, Cissy Wechter)	
 "The Joker"	(Leslie Bricusse, Anthony Newley)
 "Going Out of My Head"	(Teddy Randazzo, Bobby Weinstein)
 "Tim Dom Dom (Chim Dome Dome)"  (João Mello, Clodoaldo Brito)
 "Day Tripper"  (John Lennon, Paul McCartney) [printed on LP as 'Daytripper']	
 "Água de Beber (Agwa gee Beberr)" (Antônio Carlos Jobim, Vinícius de Moraes, Norman Gimbel)
 "Slow Hot Wind" (Henry Mancini, Norman Gimbel)
 "O Pato (O Pawtoo)" (Jayme Silva, Neuza Teixeira)
 "Berimbau" (Baden Powell, Vinícius de Moraes)

Personnel
Sérgio Mendes – piano, backing vocals, keyboards, arrangements 
Lani Hall – lead vocals
Bibi Vogel – backing vocals
Bob Matthews – bass, backing vocals
José Soares – percussion, backing vocals
João Palma – drums

Charts

Certifications

References

1966 debut albums
Bossa nova albums
Sérgio Mendes albums
A&M Records albums
Albums produced by Herb Alpert
Albums produced by Jerry Moss
Albums arranged by Sérgio Mendes
Albums recorded at Sunset Sound Recorders